Mihrimah Sultan may refer to:

 Mihrimah Sultan (daughter of Suleiman I) (1522–1578), Ottoman princess
 Mihrümah Sultan (daughter of Şehzade Bayezid) (1547–1602), Ottoman princess
 Mihrimah Sultan (daughter of Murad III) (1579–), Ottoman princess
 Mihrimah Sultan (daughter of Mahmud II) (1812–1838), Ottoman princess
 Mihrimah Sultan (daughter of Şehzade Ziyaeddin) (1922–2000), Ottoman princess